is a Japanese politician from the Liberal Democratic Party of Japan (LDP) and a member of the House of Representatives in the Diet (national legislature). She represents Hokkaido through the proportional representation block. She was a member of the Democratic Party of Japan and New Party Daichi.

Personal life 
Suzuki is the daughter of veteran Hokkaido politician Muneo Suzuki. She graduated with a B.A. in International Politics from Trent University in Canada and worked as a television director at NHK before entering politics.

She is married to a cameraman friend who went to the same elementary school with her. Their first child was born in September 2017.

References

External links 
  in Japanese.

1986 births
Living people
Politicians from Hokkaido
Trent University alumni
Members of the House of Representatives (Japan)
Liberal Democratic Party (Japan) politicians
Democratic Party of Japan politicians
21st-century Japanese politicians
People from Obihiro, Hokkaido